Top 100 may refer to:

Music
Rolling Stone Top 100, in the United States
Billboard Hot 100, in the United States
Triple J Hottest 100, an annual favourite song list, based on the votes of Australian youth radio station Triple J listeners

Publications
The 100: A Ranking of the Most Influential Persons in History, a  1978 book by Michael H. Hart
The Top 100 Crime Novels of All Time, a list published in book form in 1990 by the UK-based Crime Writers' Association
100 Women (BBC),  a BBC multi-format series established in 2013, examining the role of women in the 21st century

Television
Greatest South Africans (television series), the 100 greatest South Africans of all time

Gaming
Mario Party: The Top 100, a Nintendo 3DS game featuring 100 minigames taken from the ten console Mario Party games.

See also
100 greatest (disambiguation)